The 1974 Vermont gubernatorial election took place on November 5, 1974. Incumbent Democrat Thomas P. Salmon ran successfully for a second term as Governor of Vermont, defeating Republican candidate Walter L. Kennedy and Liberty Union candidate Martha Abbott.

Democratic primary

Results

Republican primary

Results

General election

Results

References

Vermont
1974
Gubernatorial
November 1974 events in the United States